Choudhary Ali Asjad Malhi is a former Pakistani Minister and Member of the National Assembly of Pakistan from Sialkot District. He served in the National Assembly of Pakistan from 16 November 2002 to 15 November 2008.He was Defeated by Syeda Nosheen Iftikhar in 2021 By Election of NA-75 (Sialkot-IV).

Personal life 
Malhi belongs to a family of Bureaucrats and is a businessman by profession. He is the nephew of Sikandar Hayat Malhi who was also a member of the National Assembly as well as the Punjab Provincial Assembly.

Political career 

Malhi started his political career serving as District Naib Nazim 

He was later elected to the National Assembly of Pakistan in 2002. He defeated the Independent candidate Armaghan Subhani.

He served as Federal Minister of Information Technology and Telecommunications Division as well as minister of State for Defense.

Malhi was a former member of Pakistan Muslim League (Q) and joined Pakistan Tehreek-e-Insaf in 2014.

Ali Asjad lost to PML-N Candidate Syed Iftikhar Ul Hassan in the 2018 general election. In the 2021 bye election, Ali Asjad lost to PML-N Candidate Syeda Nosheen Iftikhar.

Malhi among the key PTI leaders who were arrested  and his house which was a rendezvous point was raided.

References 

Pakistani MNAs 2002–2007
Pakistan Tehreek-e-Insaf MNAs
Living people
Year of birth missing (living people)
Pakistan Muslim League (Q) MNAs